Christopher Hibbert MC (born Arthur Raymond Hibbert; 5 March 1924 – 21 December 2008) was an English author, popular historian and biographer. 

He has been called "a pearl of biographers" (New Statesman) and "probably the most widely-read popular historian of our time and undoubtedly one of the most prolific" (The Times). Hibbert  was the author of many books, including The Story of England, Disraeli, Edward VII, George III, George IV, The Rise and Fall of the House of Medici, and Cavaliers and Roundheads. He was a Fellow of the Royal Society of Literature.

Biography
Arthur Raymond Hibbert was born in Enderby, Leicestershire in 1924, the son of Canon H. V. Hibbert (died 1980) and his wife Maude. He was the second of three children, and christened Arthur Raymond. He was educated at Radley College in Oxfordshire before he went up to Oriel College at the University of Oxford. He was awarded the degrees of BA and later MA.

He left Oriel College to join the Army, where a sergeant major referred to Hibbert as "Christopher Robin" (of Winnie the Pooh books) based upon his youthful looks. The name "Christopher" subsequently stuck. During World War II, Hibbert served as an infantry officer in the London Irish Rifles regiment in Italy, reaching the rank of captain. He was wounded twice and awarded the Military Cross in 1945.

From 1945 to 1959, he was a partner in a firm of land agents and auctioneers, and began his writing career in 1957. Hibbert was awarded the Heinemann Award for Literature in 1962 for The Destruction of Lord Raglan.

Personal life
Hibbert lived at Henley-on-Thames, Oxfordshire, and was a member of the Army and Navy Club and the Garrick Club. He was married to Susan Piggford and the couple had three children: his literary executor Kate Hibbert, television writer Jimmy Hibbert and music journalist Tom Hibbert.

He died on 21 December 2008, in Henley, from bronchial pneumonia at the age of 84. He was cremated, after a humanist ceremony in Oxford, on 2 January 2009.

Works

 The Road to Tyburn: The Story of Jack Sheppard and the Eighteenth Century Underworld (Longmans, 1957)
 King Mob: The Story of Lord George Gordon and the Riots of 1780 (Longmans, 1958)
 Wolfe at Quebec (Longmans, 1959)
 Corunna (B. T. Batsford, 1961) 
 The Destruction of Lord Raglan (Longmans, 1961)
 Benito Mussolini. A Biography (Longmans, 1962)
 The Battle of Arnhem (B. T. Batsford Ltd, 1962)
 The Roots of Evil: A Social History of Crime and Punishment (Weidenfeld & Nicolson, 1963)
 Agincourt (Batsford, 1964)
 The Wheatley Diary: A Journal and Sketch-book kept during the Peninsular War and the Waterloo Campaign (Longmans, 1964) editor
 The Court at Windsor. A Domestic History (Longmans, 1964) later revised
 Garibaldi and His Enemies (Longmans, 1965)
 The Making of Charles Dickens (HarperCollins, 1967)
 Waterloo: Napoleon's Last Campaign (New English Library, 1967) 
 Highwaymen (Weidenfeld and Nicolson, 1967)
 Charles I (Weidenfeld and Nicolson, 1968)
 London: The Biography of a City (Longmans, Green & Co., 1969)
 The Grand Tour (Weidenfeld and Nicolson, 1969)
 The Search for King Arthur (Cassell, 1969)
 The Dragon Wakes: China and the West, 1793-1911 (Longmans, 1970)
 The Personal History of Samuel Johnson (Longmans, 1971)
 Tower of London (Newsweek [Series: Wonders of Man], 1971) 
 Edward: The Uncrowned King (Macdonald, 1972)
 George IV. Prince of Wales, 1762-1811 Vol 1: (Longman, 1972)
 George IV. Regent and King, 1811-1830 Vol 2: (Allen Lane, 1974)
 The Rise and Fall of the House of Medici (Allen Lane, 1974) reprinted by the Folio Society, 1998
 Versailles (Series: Wonders of Man, 1975)
 The Illustrated London News: Social History of Victorian Britain (Angus and Robertson, 1975)
 Edward VII: A Portrait (Allen Lane, 1976)
 Disraeli and his World (Thames and Hudson, 1978) 
 The Great Mutiny: India, 1857 (Allen Lane, 1978), as Penguin Pocketbook: 1980, .
 The Court of St James's: The Monarch at Work from Victoria to Elizabeth II (Weidenfeld and Nicolson, 1979) 
 The French Revolution (Penguin, 1980) .
 Africa Explored: Europeans in the Dark Continent, 1769-1889 (Allen Lane, 1982)
 Chateaux of the Loire (Series: Wonders of Man, 1983)
 The London Encyclopaedia with Ben Weinreb (Macmillan, 1983) later revised
 Rome: The Biography of a City (Viking, 1985) 
 Cities and Civilisations (Weidenfeld and Nicolson, 1986)  reprinted by the Folio Society, 2003
 The English: A Social History (Grafton, 1987) 
 Venice: The Biography of a City (Grafton, 1988)
 The Encyclopaedia of Oxford (Macmillan, 1988)
 Redcoats and Rebels (Grafton, 1990) 
 The Virgin Queen: The Personal History of Elizabeth I (Viking, 1990)
 Florence: The Biography of a City (Viking, 1993) 
 Cavaliers & Roundheads: The English Civil War, 1642–1649 (HarperCollins, 1993)
 The Story of England (Phaidon Press, 1994)
 Nelson: A Personal History (Penguin, 1994) 
 
 Wellington: A Personal History (HarperCollins, 1997)
 George III: A Personal History (Penguin, 1998) 
 Queen Victoria: A Personal History (HarperCollins, 2000)
 The Marlboroughs: John and Sarah Churchill 1650-1744 (Viking, 2001)
 Napoleon: His Wives and Women (HarperCollins, 2002)
 Great Battles: Agincourt (Phoenix new edition 2003) 
 Disraeli: A Personal History (HarperCollins, 2004)
 Disraeli: The Victorian Dandy Who Became Prime Minister (Palgrave Macmillan, New York City 2006) . 
 The Borgias and Their Enemies: 1431–1519 (Mariner Books, 2009)

References

Further reading

External links 
 

1924 births
2008 deaths
People from Enderby, Leicestershire
People educated at Radley College
Alumni of Oriel College, Oxford
English humanists
Fellows of the Royal Geographical Society
Fellows of the Royal Society of Literature
British military historians
Military personnel from Leicestershire
British Army personnel of World War II
Recipients of the Military Cross
London Irish Rifles officers
Deaths from pneumonia in England
Historians of the American Revolution
Historians of the French Revolution
Historians of the Napoleonic Wars
Historians of England
English encyclopedists
20th-century English historians
English biographers